Matthew Psaltis served as Greek Orthodox Patriarch of Alexandria between 1746 and 1766. He was born in the Greek island of Andros.

References
General

Specific

18th-century Greek Patriarchs of Alexandria
18th-century Greek people
People from Andros